Eoophyla basilissa is a moth in the family Crambidae. It was described by Edward Meyrick in 1894. It is found in Indonesia (Sambawa).

References

Eoophyla
Moths described in 1894